Antoine Karam may refer to:
 Antoine Karam (French Guianan politician)
 Antoine Karam (Lebanese politician)

See also
 Marie-Antoine Carême, French chef